Yoel Bouza is an American technology entrepreneur and investor. He has played a key role most notably in e-commerce as the founder and CEO of Monstrogo.com, an online merchant of electronics and later of a wide variety of products and services.

References
 https://www.linkedin.com/pub/dir/Yoel/Bouza/us-56-Miami%2FFort-Lauderdale-Area

1987 births
Living people